Giacomo Peppicelli (27 March 1928 - 7 July 2011) was an Italian male long distance runner who won ten national titles at senior level.

Biography
On the evening of June 27, 1956 in the athletics track of Turin, where, under the careful eye of his coach Reposi, he makes his own the Italian records of the hour, 20 km, 25 km and 30 km.

National titles
He won 10 national championships at individual senior level.
Italian Athletics Championships
5000 metres: 1952, 1954
10,000 metres: 1951, 1952, 1953
Half marathon: 1953, 1957
Italian Cross Country Championships
Long race: 1951, 1953. 1955

References

External links
 Giacomo Peppicelli un campione da rivalutare 

1928 births
2011 deaths
Italian male long-distance runners
Italian male cross country runners